No Reply may refer to:

 No Reply (album), by Daylight Dies
 "No Reply" (song), by the Beatles
 "No Reply", a song by Buzzcocks from Another Music in a Different Kitchen